St. Demetrius' Church is a church in Tuminec, Korçë County, Albania. It is a Cultural Monument of Albania.

References

Cultural Monuments of Albania
Buildings and structures in Pustec Municipality
Churches in Korçë County